Madhuca boerlageana is a species of plant in the family Sapotaceae. It is found in Indonesia and Papua New Guinea. It is threatened by habitat loss.

References

boerlageana
Critically endangered plants
Taxonomy articles created by Polbot
Taxa named by Charles Baehni
Taxa named by William Burck